The 1956–57 Serie C was the nineteenth edition of Serie C, the third highest league in the Italian football league system.

There were only three relegations because of the reform of the IV Serie.

Final classification

Serie C seasons
3
Italy